Farnesylcysteine lyase (FC lyase, FCLY) is an enzyme with systematic name S-(2E,6E)-farnesyl-L-cysteine oxidase. This enzyme catalyses the following chemical reaction

 S-(2E,6E)-farnesyl-L-cysteine + O2 + H2O  (2E,6E)-farnesal + L-cysteine + H2O2

Farnesylcysteine lyase is a flavoprotein (FAD).

References

External links 
 

EC 1.8.3